Filip Havelka (born 21 January 1998) is a professional Czech football midfielder currently playing for AC Sparta Prague in the Czech First League.

He made his senior league debut for Sparta Prague on 16 October 2016 in a Czech First League 3–0 home win against Jihlava. In July 2017, he went on loan to Liberec, another Czech First League side.

References

External links 
 
 Filip Havelka official international statistics
 
 Filip Havelka profile on the AC Sparta Prague official website

Czech footballers
1998 births
Living people
Czech First League players
AC Sparta Prague players
Association football midfielders
Footballers from Prague
FC Slovan Liberec players
SK Dynamo České Budějovice players
Czech National Football League players
Czech Republic youth international footballers